Mika is a unisex given name, a nickname and a surname. It may also refer to:

 Mika, Masovian Voivodeship, a village in Poland
 FC Mika, a defunct Armenian football team
 Mika Stadium, a football stadium in Yerevan, Armenia, former home ground for FC Mika
 Mika VM, open-source Java VM for embedded use

See also
 Myka (disambiguation)